Osman Pepe (born 7 August 1954) is a Turkish politician of the Justice and Development Party (AK Party). He is the Minister of Environment in the government of Recep Tayyip Erdoğan. He helped pass an animal welfare law in Turkey.

References

1954 births
Living people
Haydarpaşa High School alumni
Government ministers of Turkey
Justice and Development Party (Turkey) politicians
Members of the 23rd Parliament of Turkey
Members of the 22nd Parliament of Turkey
Members of the 21st Parliament of Turkey
Members of the 20th Parliament of Turkey